Burarra may refer to:
 Burarra people, an ethnic group of Australia
 Burarra language, an Australian language

See also 
 Burara, a genus of butterflies

Language and nationality disambiguation pages